Spinoberea cephalotes is a species of beetle in the family Cerambycidae. It was described by Gressitt in 1942.

References

Saperdini
Beetles described in 1942